Scream is the debut English studio album and the third overall studio album by German band Tokio Hotel. It contains English versions of songs from their previous albums Schrei and Zimmer 483: eight of the twelve songs come from Zimmer 483 while the remaining four originated from Schrei. The name Scream is the English translation of the name of the first Tokio Hotel album, Schrei. 

In German-speaking countries, the album was released as Room 483 – the English translation of their second album's name ("Zimmer 483"). The first single released from the album was simply called "Monsoon" – not "Through the Monsoon" (the literal translation of the original, "Durch den Monsun").

Reception

Initial critical response to Scream was mixed. At Metacritic, which assigns a normalized rating out of 100 to reviews from mainstream critics, the album has received a score of 51, based on four reviews. In the US, Tokio Hotel won the MTV VMA Best New Artist award for the album.

Track listing
Credits adapted from the liner notes of Scream.

Best Buy has an exclusive DVD with a behind the scenes look at their US concert shows and three live videos ("Scream", "Don't Jump" and "Rescue Me" live at the Roxy Concert Hall in Hollywood).

Singles chronology
Europe (except UK) and Latin America
"Monsoon"
"Ready, Set, Go!"
"Don't Jump" (Only Europe (except UK), Argentina and radio release in Costa Rica)

United Kingdom
"Ready, Set, Go!"

United States and Canada
"Scream"
"Ready, Set, Go!"
"Monsoon"

Release history

Charts

Weekly charts

Year-end charts

Certifications

References

External links

2007 albums
Tokio Hotel albums